Sabriye Gönülkırmaz (born May 17, 1994 in Istanbul, Turkey) is a Turkish volleyball player. Played in the past as wing spiker, she changed her position now to middle blocker. She currently plays for Yeşilyurt Women's Volleyball Team, which competes in the Turkish Women's Volleyball League. Gönülkırmaz is a member of the Turkey women's youth national volleyball team, and wears number 13.

A native of Istanbul, she began with volleyball sport at the age of nine in Altınyıldız Sport Club, where she was coached by Feyzullah Yücetürk.

Clubs
  Altınyıldız (2004-2008)
  Yeşilyurt (2008-2009)
  TVF Sport High School (2009-2011)
  Yeşilyurt (2011-2012)

Awards

National team
2011 FIVB Girls Youth World Championship - 
2011 European Youth Summer Olympic Festival - 
2012 Women's Junior European Volleyball Championship -

See also
 Turkish women in sports

References

1994 births
Volleyball players from Istanbul
Living people
Turkish women's volleyball players
Yeşilyurt volleyballers
21st-century Turkish women